Bria is a name. It has been used as both a given name and surname. Notable people include:

Given name
 Bria Hartley (born 1992), American professional basketball player
 Bria Skonberg (born 1983), Canadian trumpet player, vocalist and composer
 Bria Valente, American singer

Surname
 Benyamin Yosef Bria (1956–2007), Indonesian Bishop of the Roman Catholic Diocese of Denpasar
 Dora Bria (1958–2008), Brazilian windsurfer
 George E. Bria (1916–2017), Italian American journalist
 Modesto Bria (1922–1996), Paraguayan football midfielder and manager

Feminine given names